The Fire HD, also known as Kindle Fire HD, is a member of the Amazon Fire family of tablet computers. Fire HD refers to Amazon Fire family tablets with HD resolution. The ten generation Fire HD subfamily consists of: 7" and 8.9" (2012 models), 7" (2013 model), 6" and 7" (2014 models), 8" and 10.1" (2015 models), 8" (2016 model), 8" and 10.1" (2017 models), 8" (2018 model), 10.1" (2019 model), 8" (2020 model), and 10.1" (2021 model). These devices run the Fire OS operating system.

History
The first Fire HD model was announced on September 6, 2012, and was available in two versions: 7" and 8.9".  The 7" model was released in United States on September 14, then France, Germany, Italy, Spain, United Kingdom on October 25 and in Japan on December 18. The 8.9" model was released on November 20 in United States, in Japan on March 12, 2013, in Germany on March 13, and in India on June 27.

On September 25, 2013, the Fire HD second generation was released. The price of the Fire HD 7" was reduced to $139, the processor speed was upgraded to 1.5 GHz, upgraded from "Android based" OS to a compatible proprietary fork of Android named Fire OS 3, removed the front camera, used a new form factor and decreased the available storage options. In addition, the Fire HD's successor the Kindle Fire HDX was introduced.

On October 2, 2014, the Fire HD third generation was released, which is part of the Fire Tablet's fourth generation, with 6-inch and 7-inch touchscreen sizes. In addition, the Fire HD Kids Edition was released, which is the same device as the Fire HD 6 except it comes with a case and one-year subscription to Kindle Freetime apps. In addition, the name "Kindle" was officially removed from the tablets' name.

In September 2015, Amazon released a new range of Fire tablets with 7, 8, and 10.1 inch sizes. The 7 inch was simply called the Fire 7, while the 8" and 10.1" were called Fire HD 8 and Fire HD 10 respectively. The Fire 7 is unique as it is, thus far, the lowest priced Fire tablet at $50.  In September 2016, Amazon announced the new Fire HD 8 with Alexa starting at $90.

In 2017, the seventh Generation Fire 7 Fire HD 8 were released. Some differences between the 6th and 7th Generation HD 8 models were the price, the gyroscope removal, the increase of maximum SD card expansion, and the better graphics chip.

In September 2018, Amazon refreshed their Fire tablet line with the release of eighth Generation Fire HD 8/Kids Edition and HD 10. The price remained the same as last year's model with minor upgrade on the hardware where the external storage is expandable to 400GB. On the software side, the 2018 model is preinstalled with Fire OS 6 that allows hands-free Alexa control.

On October 7, 2019, Amazon announced an update to the Fire HD 10 that was released on October 30, 2019. The major hardware differences compared to the previous version were replacement of microUSB with USB-C, a faster processor (upgraded from Quad-Core up to 1.8 GHz to Octa-core 2.0 GHz, which Amazon claims is 30% faster than the previous one) and battery life that is 2 hours longer than the previous generation. The screen size and price remained unchanged. A new color option, white, was also added.

In 2020, the Fire HD 8 was updated with a faster 64-bit quad-core SoC, more storage (from 16/32GB to 32/64GB), USB-C, brighter display, enhanced wifi fidelity, a new front camera location (for landscape video chats instead of portrait), and Fire OS 7 (based on Android 9). It came in two versions: 2GB RAM (HD 8) and 3GB RAM (HD 8 Plus). The 3GB RAM version, which enabled more memory-intensive apps, was available only in US, UK, DE, and JP marketplaces.

In 2021, the Fire HD 10 was refreshed with a new front camera location (for landscape video chats instead of portrait) and slimmer side bezels, leading to a more symmetrical design.  Also, wireless charging was introduced for the "HD 10 Plus" model. The HD 10 Plus also has 4GB of RAM.

Design

Hardware 
The Fire tablets feature multi-touch touchscreen LCD screens. The first generation 7" model contains a Texas Instruments OMAP 4460 processor, while the 8.9" model uses an OMAP 4470 processor. All three models feature Dolby audio and stereo speakers. The 7" model's speakers are dual-driver, while the 8.9" model's are single-driver. The device has two Wi-Fi antennas on the 2.4 GHz and 5 GHz bands which utilize MIMO to improve reception. The Fire HD also added Bluetooth connectivity allowing users to connect an array of wireless accessories including keyboards. The first generation models have an HDMI port, but this is missing from future generations.

In June 2016, Amazon released a version of the Fire HD 10 that has an aluminum exterior instead of plastic like the other Fire tablets, and is available at the same price as the plastic version.

The first Fire HD model to get an octa-core processor was the HD 10 tablet released in 2019.  USB-C replaced the microUSB for charging in the HD 10 in 2019 and the HD 8 in 2020.  The position of the front-facing camera was redesigned to permit landscape video chats in the HD 8 in 2020 and the HD 10 in 2021. Also higher RAM versions were released: 3GB RAM in the "HD 8 plus" in 2020 and 4GB RAM in the "HD 10 plus" in 2021.

Software 

The 2012 models use software that introduced user profiles for sharing among family members and the ability to place absolute limits on total usage or usage of individual features, called FreeTime, and tracks the user's reading speed to predict when the user will finish a chapter or book. The OS is based on a version of Android 4.0.3 "Ice Cream Sandwich". This does not allow use of Google Play, limiting the number of apps accessible for the Fire HD. Fire HD software updates can be received OTA or from the support websites.

The Fire HD 7" second generation used Fire OS 3. Note that although this version is called the Fire HD 7", it is not the successor to the original Fire HD. This model is the successor to the Fire second generation. The Fire HD models second generation were updated to FireOS 4.1.1, based on Android 4.4.4, in Q3 2014.

The Fire HD 6" and 7" third generation uses Fire OS 4 "Sangria", which features profiles so each user on the tablet can have their own settings and apps.

The Fire HD 8 and 10 fifth generation uses Fire OS 5 "Bellini" and was released in late 2015.  In September 2016, Amazon released virtual assistant Alexa for the sixth generation Fire tablets.

The 2018 model of the Fire HD 8 has Fire OS 6 preinstalled, which is based on Android 7.1 "Nougat". It also includes Alexa Hands-Free and the new "Show Mode", in which the tablet acts like an Amazon Echo Show.

The 2019 model of the Fire HD 10 (and the 2020 model of Fire HD 8) has Fire OS 7 preinstalled, which is based on Android 9 "Pie".

The 2021 model of the Fire HD 10 / Fire HD 10 Plus introduced 64-bit app support (arm64-v8a Android ABI) for the first time in the Fire HD series.

Models 
Overview on generations and models for all Fire tablet devices:

Detailed specifications for all Fire HD tagged tablet devices:

*table above only includes data on "HD"-branded tablets

The Model number consists of three parts: first the KF prefix for 'Kindle Fire', second one or two letters derived from the code name, third WI for Wi-Fi or WA for cellular interface.

See also 
 Comparison of:
 Tablet computers
 E-book readers

References

External links 
 Official Amazon.com site for Fire Tablets
 Kindle Fire HD Press Event Article at Ars Technica

Fire HD
Android (operating system) devices
Tablet computers
Touchscreen portable media players
Tablet computers introduced in 2012